Arcadia Vale is a suburb of the City of Lake Macquarie in New South Wales, Australia between the town centres of Toronto and Morisset on the western shore of Lake Macquarie. It had a population of 1,381 down from 1,518 in 2006.

History 
The Awabakal people are the first people of the area.

Arcadia Vale was subdivided in 1922. During the Great Depression, many out-of-work miners and their families moved into boatsheds on the waterfront. The first school opened in 1958.

References

External links
 History of Arcadia Vale

Suburbs of Lake Macquarie
1878 establishments in Australia